Yasuhiro ASAI（浅井康宏, Asai Yasuhiro, born 9 June 1983）is an urushi [Japanese lacquer] artist and a maki-e artisan. He was born in Tottori Prefecture, Japan.

Biography 
Born on June 9, 1983, Yasuhiro Asai became interested in urushi (Japanese lacquer) and maki-e while studying at Kibi Kogen High School. In 2004, he graduated from Takaoka National College, Department of Industrial Design, Lacquerware Course. In 2005, he studied under Kazumi Murose (Designated as Important Intangible Cultural Property).

In 2007, Asai became independent, opening his own maki-e studio. He has been based in Kyoto City since June 2017.

Asai is a member of the Urushiko Shigaku Gakkai (History of Lacquerware Association), Nihon Bunkazai Urushi Kyokai(Japan Association for Cultural Property Lacquer), and the Japan Art Craft Association

Principal Award History 

 2002　Japan Urushi Association, Scholarship Award
 2004　Takaoka National College, "Yokoyama Prize"
 2008　The 51st Japan Traditional Art Crafts Chugoku Branch Exhibition, "Tottori Governor's Award"
 2010　The 54th Tottori Prefectural Art Exhibition, "Scholarship Award"
 2012　The 55th Japan Traditional Art Crafts Chugoku Branch Exhibition,"Scholarship Award"
 2012　The 59th Japan Traditional Art Crafts Exhibition,"Newcomer Award"
 2015　The 32nd Japan Traditional Urushi Works Exhibition, The Cultural Affairs Agency Commissioner's Award
 2017　The 57th East Japan Traditional Art Crafts Exhibition,"Scholarship Award"
 2018　Energia Culture and Sports Foundation, Energia Prize, Art Category
 2021　The 50th Japan Traditional Art Crafts Kinki Exhibition, "Kyoto Newspaper Prize"

Exhibits 

 2015 "Nicolai Bergmann - Flowers & Design", Shangri-La Hotel Tokyo
 2015 "Urushi no Mirai", Takahashi Setsuro Art Museum of Azumino, Nagano
 2018  Ambiente 2018 (Germany), Kyoto Zuihodo Booth, Frankfurt
 2018  Craft Sake Week, "Syukiya", Tokyo
 2018 "Urushi no Genzai 2018", Nihombashi Mitsukoshi Main Store, Tokyo
 2018  Art Expo Malaysia 2018, Gallery Hanakagesho Booth, Kuala Lumpur
 2018  URUSHI Dento to Kakushin (Tradition and Innovation), Kanagawa
 2019  "Our Collections! ~Tottori-ken no Art Collection no Koremade to Korekara~", Tottori Prefectural Museum, Tottori
 2019 "Bi no Yokan 2019―∞directions―",Takashimaya, Tokyo; Osaka; Kyoto; Aichi
 2019 "Gendai Kogei no Tenkai (Development of Contemporary Japanese Arts & Crafts) 2019", Kanazawa Yasue Gold Leaf Museum, Ishikawa
 2021 CHRISTIE'S NEW YORK "Japanese and Korean Art"
 2021 "Shikkai - Kaze no Jidai no Keishosyatachi-", Takashimaya, Tokyo; Osaka; Kyoto; Kanagawa
 2022 "Genshi no Uchu -Gendai Shitsugeika 4nin no Rinko-(The Microcosm of Illusions -the Phosphorescence by 4 Contemporary Urushi Artists-)", Ginza Wako, Tokyo

Collections 
 John C. Weber Collection
 L.U.CEUM Collection, Chopard Manufacture, Fleurier, Switzerland

Solo exhibitions 

 April 2017 "光をめぐる[Hikari wo Meguru] (Follow the Light)", Seibu Ikebukuro, Tokyo
 November 2021  "情熱[Jonetsu]ーPassionー", Seibu Ikebukuro, Tokyo

Books 

 -光をめぐる- [Hikari wo Meguru (Follow the Light)] Yasuhiro Asai  A Collection of Maki-e Works　Author: Yasuhiro Asai. Published by Studio Zipangu　First Edition, April 1, 2017,　ISBN 978-4-9909546-0-4
 情熱-Passion- Yasuhiro Asai  A Collection of Lacquerware Works　Author: Yasuhiro Asai. Published by Studio Zipangu　First Edition, November 10, 2021,　ISBN 978-4-9909546-1-1

Footnotes

External links 
 Official Site
 Instagram
 Twitter
 Yasuhiro ASAI Official Secretariat

Urushi artists
Japanese lacquerware artists
1983 births
People from Tottori Prefecture
Living people